Leucolysin (Leucostoma neutral proteinase, Leucostoma peptidase A) is an enzyme. This enzyme catalyses the following chemical reaction

 Cleavage of Phe1-Val, His5-Leu, Ala14-Leu, Gly20-Glu, Gly23-Phe and Phe24-Phe bonds in insulin B chain as well as N-blocked dipeptides

This enzyme is isolated from the venom of the western cottonmouth moccasin snake (Agkistrodon piscivorus leucostoma).

References

External links 
 

EC 3.4.24